Government Center is a district within the city of Newark in Essex County, New Jersey, United States. It is considered a part of Downtown Newark and is named for the presence of government buildings centered on a plaza known as Federal Square. It hosts the US Citizen and Immigration Services, the Social Security Administration, and the US Attorney's Office for New Jersey as well as many other federal agencies. It is part of the Four Corners Historic District. 
 
The district is just south of Four Corners on the east side of Broad Street and the Prudential Center and north of Newark Symphony Hall and The Coast neighborhood. In the center is Grace Episcopal Church, a national historic site, where the tune of America the Beautiful was written. To the east near Mulberry Street is the area that at one time was Newark's Chinatown, and host to restaurants serving the district and the sports center. The surrounding area includes mid-rise government buildings and at-grade parking lots.

Government buildings 

At one time Federal Square had been called Vroom Alley, but was renamed in recognition of the concentration of the following buildings:
 Peter W. Rodino, Jr. Federal Office Building
 Newark City Hall
 Main Post Office and U.S. Courthouse
 Police Headquarters & Municipal Court Building
 Martin Luther King, Jr. Federal Building & U.S. Courthouse

See also

New Jersey Superior Court
Gibraltar Building
Newark Legal Center

References

External links
 NJ Judiciary: Map of Newark offices

Neighborhoods in Newark, New Jersey